Auguste Sallé (1820 – 5 May 1896, Paris) was a French traveller and entomologist who specialised in Coleoptera.

Following expeditions to the Southern States of the USA, the West Indies, Central America (especially Mexico), and Venezuela on behalf of Louis Alexandre Auguste Chevrolat and  accompanied by his mother and a M. Vasselet, Sallé returned to Paris to set up as a natural history and insect dealer. The business thrived, and he sold specimens to many very wealthy amateur entomologists: Edmond Jean-Baptiste Fleutiaux, Henri Boileau, Neervoort Jacob R. H. van de Poll, René Oberthür, Antoine Henri Grouvelle, Grivard,  and André Thery as well as to other Paris dealerships of Henri Donckier de Donceel, Achille Deyrolle and Émile Deyrolle. These specimens together with his private collection are in the Muséum national d'histoire naturelle. Insects sold to Frederick DuCane Godman and Osbert Salvin are in the Natural History Museum, London.  
He was a member of the Société entomologique de France and the Entomological Society of London

Sallé is commemorated in the scientific names of two reptiles: a species of snake, Geophis sallaei ; and a subspecies of lizard, Anolis sericeus sallaei.

References

Further reading
Anonym 1896 [Salle, A.] Entomologist's Monthly Magazine (3) 32 141 
Constantin, R. 1992 Memorial des Coléopteristes Français. Bull. liaison Assoc. Col. reg. parisienne, Paris (Suppl. 14) : 1-92 81-82 
Meldola, R. 1896 [Salle, A.]  Proc. Ent. Soc. London 1896 93-94

External links
Sclater P.L., 1856. Catalogue of the birds collected by Auguste Sallé in southern Mexico, with descriptions of new species.Proceedings of the Zoological Society of London 24: 283-311.

1820 births
1896 deaths
French entomologists